Orthocomotis gielisi is a species of moth of the family Tortricidae. It is found in Napo Province, Ecuador.

The wingspan is 27 mm. The ground colour of the forewings is white with reddish rust and olive brown suffusions marked with brown scales. The hindwings are dark brown.

Etymology
The species is named in honour of Dr. Cees Gielis.

References

Moths described in 2007
Orthocomotis